LS1 may refer to:
 Central Leeds postcode
 GM LS engine
 MACS J1149 Lensed Star 1 - most distant star detected, sometimes abbreviated to LS1
 Nexaer LS1, American light-sport aircraft
 Rolladen-Schneider LS1 glider
 Landsat 1, satellite abbreviated to LS-1 
724

See also
Ls(1)